Kissinger Associates, Inc. is a New York City-based international geopolitical consulting firm, founded and run by Henry Kissinger since 1982. The firm assists its clients in identifying strategic partners and investment opportunities and advising them on government relations.

History
The firm was founded in 1982 by Henry Kissinger. In 1999 Mack McLarty joined Kissinger to expand the firm and its New York headquarters to open Kissinger McLarty Associates, with the firm's Washington office on 18th Street and Pennsylvania Avenue in Washington, D.C. McLarty was White House Chief of Staff under Bill Clinton. Kissinger McLarty is a corporate member of the Council of the Americas, the New York-based business organization established by David Rockefeller in 1965. As of January 2008, the two firms have separated after just under a decade and McLarty Associates, headed by Mack McLarty, is an independent firm based in Washington.

Kissinger Associates was located for nearly 40 years at 350 Park Avenue at 51st Street, in a building formerly also occupied by Peter Peterson's Blackstone Group.  It was established in July 1982 after loans had been secured from Goldman Sachs and a consortium of three other banks. These loans were repaid in two years; by 1987 annual revenues had reached $5 million.

Kissinger Associates doesn’t disclose its clients under U.S. lobbying laws. The firm once threatened to sue Congress to resist a subpoena for its client list. It has in the past advised American Express, Anheuser-Busch, Coca-Cola, Daewoo, Midland Bank, H. J. Heinz, ITT Corporation, LM Ericsson, Fiat, and Volvo. But the firm does belong to the U.S.–Russia Business Council, a trade group that includes ExxonMobil, JPMorgan Chase, and Pfizer.

Organization

Associated organizations
Kissinger Associates has had strategic alliances with several firms, including:
APCO Worldwide, (October 12, 2004)
The Blackstone Group, an investment and advisory firm
Hakluyt & Company, a strategic intelligence and advisory firm
Covington & Burling, international law firm (2003)

Prominent staff
L. Paul Bremer, former managing director and former Iraq Director of Reconstruction
Nelson Cunningham, political advisor and managing partner at Kissinger McLarty
Lawrence Eagleburger, former U.S. Secretary of State
Richard W. Fisher, President, Federal Reserve Bank of Dallas
Timothy F. Geithner, former U.S. Secretary of Treasury
Jami Miscik, former president and vice chairman, former CIA Deputy Director for Intelligence
Joshua Cooper Ramo, former Managing Director, former senior editor of Time Magazine
Bill Richardson, former senior managing director, former U.S diplomat, past Governor of New Mexico, past Energy Secretary, past UN Ambassador
J. Stapleton Roy, vice-chairman and former senior U.S. diplomat
Brent Scowcroft, former vice-chairman and former U.S. National Security Advisor
John O. Brennan, former Director of the Central Intelligence Agency, world affairs consultant

Directors 
Lord Carrington, former NATO Secretary-General (from 1982)
Pehr G. Gyllenhammar, Volvo Chairman (from 1982)
William D. Rogers, former Undersecretary of State for Economic Affairs (from 1982)
Eric Roll, S. G. Warburg & Co Chairman (from 1984)
William E. Simon, former U.S. Treasury Secretary (from 1984)
Saburo Okita, former Japanese Foreign Minister

Étienne Davignon, former European Commissioner
Gary Falle, Falle Strategies

Clients
Kissinger Associates does not disclose its list of corporate clients, and reportedly bars clients from acknowledging the relationship.  However, over time details from proxy statements and the tendency of senior businessmen to talk about their relationship with Kissinger have leaked out and a number of major corporate clients have been identified.

The secrecy of their corporate client list has caused problems where Kissinger or a member of his staff were called to public service. In 1989, George H. W. Bush nominated Lawrence Eagleburger as his Deputy Secretary of State. Congress required that Eagleburger disclose the names of 16 clients, some of which were his through his Kissinger Associates affiliation. Later, Kissinger himself was appointed chairman of the National Commission on Terrorist Attacks Upon the United States by George W. Bush. Congressional Democrats insisted that Kissinger disclose the names of clients.  Kissinger and President Bush claimed that such disclosures were not necessary, but Kissinger ultimately stepped down, citing conflicts of interest.

A selected list of the more notable companies (from over two dozen in total) since 1982; his directorships where applicable; and some countries where known advice/contacts were used:
American Express - Director (Hungary, Japan)
American International Group - Director, International Advisory Committee (Argentina, China, South Korea)
Atlantic Richfield
Chase Manhattan Bank (now JPMorgan Chase) - Chairman, International Advisory Committee
Coca-Cola (Malaysia)
Fiat
Freeport-McMoRan - Director (Burma, Indonesia, Panama)
Heinz (Ivory Coast, Turkey, Zimbabwe)
Hollinger, Inc. - Director
Lehman Brothers  Kissinger McLarty Assoc. is listed as a creditor in the Bankruptcy Filings.
Merck
Rio Tinto Group
Volvo
Warburg

References

Bibliography
Niall Ferguson, Kissinger: 1923-1968, New York: Penguin Press, 2015.
Walter Isaacson, Kissinger: A Biography, New York: Simon & Schuster, 1992, updated 2005.

External links
Kissinger Associates, Inc. by SourceWatch

Organizations based in New York City
Foreign policy and strategy think tanks in the United States
Consulting firms established in 1982
1982 establishments in New York City
Henry Kissinger